The 1928–29  Hong Kong First Division League season was the 21st since its establishment.

League table

Championship playoff

Championship playoff (replay)

References
1928–29 Hong Kong First Division table (RSSSF)
香港倒後鏡blog

1928–29 domestic association football leagues
Hong Kong First Division League seasons
3